

363001–363100 

|-bgcolor=#f2f2f2
| colspan=4 align=center | 
|}

363101–363200 

|-id=115
| 363115 Chuckwood ||  || Charles (Chuck) Wood (born 1942) made fundamental insights into the role of cratering and volcanism in shaping planetary surfaces. He tirelessly promoted science education through numerous books, popular articles and the internet. His development of education programs introduced many students to science. || 
|}

363201–363300 

|-bgcolor=#f2f2f2
| colspan=4 align=center | 
|}

363301–363400 

|-bgcolor=#f2f2f2
| colspan=4 align=center | 
|}

363401–363500 

|-bgcolor=#f2f2f2
| colspan=4 align=center | 
|}

363501–363600 

|-id=504
| 363504 Belleau ||  || Remy Belleau (1528–1577), a French poet || 
|-id=582
| 363582 Folpotat ||  || The Folpotat, a small river in the Canton of Jura, Switzerland || 
|}

363601–363700 

|-id=623
| 363623 Chelčický ||  || Petr Chelčický (c. 1390–1460), a Czech religious thinker and writer from South Bohemia, known for The Net of True Faith, one of precursors of the Reformation. || 
|}

363701–363800 

|-id=706
| 363706 Karazija ||  ||  (born 1942), a Lithuanian theoretical physicist, science popularizer, and textbook author, who is an expert in atomic theory and Auger electron spectroscopy. || 
|}

363801–363900 

|-bgcolor=#f2f2f2
| colspan=4 align=center | 
|}

363901–364000 

|-bgcolor=#f2f2f2
| colspan=4 align=center | 
|}

References 

363001-364000